Krishika Lulla is an Indian film producer. She made her foray into producing films with 2010s romantic film Anjaana Anjaani, a co-production with Sajid Nadiadwala, starring Ranbir Kapoor and Priyanka Chopra. In December 2010, India's first live action animation film Toonpur Ka Superrhero was released, with Krishika at the helm as producer.

Personal life
Krishika married Sunil Lulla, managing director and executive vice-chair of Eros International.

Career
2011 was a successful year for the Lulla with two more movies to her credit – the much acclaimed Chalo Dilli by Shashant Shah, a fun slice of life film starring Lara Dutta and Vinay Pathak and Desi Boyz starring Akshay Kumar, John Abraham, Deepika Padukone and Chitrangada Singh. Desi Boyz had Krishika launching the talented Rohit Dhawan, son of David Dhawan in his directorial debut.

In 2013, Krishika produced the hit romantic saga Raanjhanaa, directed by Anand L. Rai, starring Sonam Kapoor, south sensation Dhanush and Abhay Deol which went on to wow critics and audiences alike. Bajatey Raho was hex production featuring an ensemble cast of Vinay Pathak, Ranvir Shorey, Tusshar Kapoor, Ravi Kishan and Dolly Ahluwalia.

In 2015, Krishika teamed up with notable director Anand L. Rai to present what would be one of the biggest hits of that year, Tanu Weds Manu Returns.  Their association further continued with Happy Bhag Jayegi, directed by Mudassar Aziz, a family entertainer starring Diana Penty, Abhay Deol, Ali Fazal and Momal Sheikh that released on 19 August 2016.

In 2016, Krishika produced the entertainment thriller Banjo, which was a musical drama which marking multiple national award-winning Marathi Director Ravi Jadhav’s debut in Hindi starring Riteish Deshmukh and Nargis Fakhri. Banjo made its worldwide release on 23 September.

With a diverse range of Bollywood films to her credit already, Krishika has also forayed into regional cinema and backed two Marathi projects -, Phuntroo, a sci-fi romantic love story, a first for Marathi cinema, directed by National Award Winning Sujay Dahake and & Jara Hatke, starring Mrinal Kulkarni, Indraneil Sengupta, Siddharth Menon and Shivani Rangole, a beautiful story of human relationships, which she co-produced with Ravi Jadhav, both of which released earlier this year (2016).

While producing movies takes up a chunk of her time, Krishika extends her entrepreneurial skills beyond films. Krishika is an active member of the Women's Wing of the IMC. She was also recently unveiled as the face of leading jewelry brand Jet Gems. Describing her as the epitome of what a woman achiever should aspire to be today, Jet Gems owner Pradeep Jethani unveiled the campaign at a glittering event at the JW Marriott recently.

Krishika also recently lent her support as the brand ambassadress to the grand opening of the famous Mumbai hot spot Enigma at the JW Marriott Mumbai which is back with a bang in its new avatar.

As brand ambassador, Krishika recently hosted the launch of the new Asian restaurant Dashanzi at JW Marriott, Juhu, Mumbai.

Filmography

References

External links

 

Living people
Hindi film producers
Indian women film producers
Film producers from Mumbai
Year of birth missing (living people)